Do Make Say Think is a Canadian instrumental band formed in Toronto, Ontario in 1995. Their music combines jazz-style drumming, distorted guitars and wind instruments, and prominent bass guitar.

Biography
The band formed in 1995 as a recording project for a Canadian youth dramatic production. They rehearsed for the production in an empty elementary school room. The four simple verbs 'Do', 'Make', 'Say' and 'Think' were painted on walls of the room, and the band adopted them as their name. In 1996, the band progressed as they practiced in the rehearsal room in the basement of the University of Toronto radio station CIUT.

The song "Chinatown" from 2002's & Yet & Yet is featured in the movie Syriana, as well as The Corporation.  The song "The Landlord is Dead" from Goodbye Enemy Airship the Landlord Is Dead and "Chinatown" from & Yet & Yet are also featured in the movie A Simple Curve.

The band's fifth full-length album, entitled You, You're a History in Rust, was released on Constellation Records in February 2007. The band toured North America and Europe to promote the release of the album, and released a tour EP, The Whole Story of Glory, to promote the Japanese leg of their tour.

In June 2009 at Luminato, Toronto's annual festival of arts and creativity, the band provided part of the live soundtrack for the outdoor screening (at Yonge-Dundas Square) of the 1919 silent German horror film Tales Of The Uncanny (Unheimliche Geschichten), alongside Canadian violinist Owen Pallett and electronica music artist Robert Lippok from Berlin, Germany.

Constellation Records released Do Make Say Think's sixth album, titled Other Truths, in October 2009. Their seventh album, titled Stubborn Persistent Illusions, was released on May 19, 2017. The album won the 2018 Juno Awards for Best Instrumental Album, and Best Artwork.* 2017 Root Structure, Ted Quinlan, Larnell Lewis and Robi Botos.

Members

Current members
Ohad Benchetrit – guitar, bass guitar, saxophone, flute
David Mitchell – drums
James Payment – drums
Justin Small – guitar, bass guitar, keyboard
Charles Spearin – bass guitar, guitar, trumpet, cornet
Julie Penner – violin, trumpet
Michael Barth - trumpet
Adam Marvy - trumpet
Judah Rubin - trumpet
Kit Schluter - trumpet
Robinson Jeffers - theremin

Previous members
Jason Mackenzie – keyboard, effects (departed after Goodbye Enemy Airship the Landlord Is Dead)
Jay Baird – saxophone
Brian Cram – trumpet

Side projects
 Justin Small is also involved in a side project called Lullabye Arkestra as a drummer with his partner and bassist Katia Taylor. They have been produced by Benchetrit who, along with Spearin, records and tours with the Toronto group Broken Social Scene.
 Spearin, Mitchell, and Benchetrit recorded an album together in 1997 under the moniker Microgroove, which put out a limited number of presses of their synthesizer and acoustic drum and bass beat working of jazz forms.
 Benchetrit and Mitchell were also involved in a side project called Sphyr, who released one album, A Poem for M, in 2003. This album is on Fire Records.
 Benchetrit's current solo project is called Years and released a self-titled album under that moniker in 2009.
 Spearin released The Happiness Project in 2009, a collection of interviews with his neighbors set to music. The album was long-listed for the Polaris Prize.
 Benchetrit and Small scored the soundtrack to the 2018 film Braven.

Discography

LPs 

 Do Make Say Think (1999)
 Goodbye Enemy Airship the Landlord Is Dead (2000)
 & Yet & Yet (2002)
Winter Hymn Country Hymn Secret Hymn (2003)
 You, You're a History in Rust (2007)
Other Truths (2009)
 Stubborn Persistent Illusions (2017)

EPs 
Besides (1999)
 The Whole Story of Glory (2008) (Japan-only)

See also
List of post-rock bands

References

External links
 Official Do Make Say Think website
 Constellation Records' Do Make Say Think website
 Southern Records' Do Make Say Think website
 Do Make Say Think collection at the Internet Archive's live music archive
"Coming Out Party: Do Make Say Think Move Beyond Post-Rock" CBC Radio 3 Live Concert Session; text by Nicolas Bragg, photography by Verena Eickhoff

Canadian post-rock groups
Musical groups established in 1995
Musical groups from Toronto
Constellation Records (Canada) artists
1995 establishments in Ontario
Juno Award for Instrumental Album of the Year winners